Grozny Group (also Grozny Volcano) is a complex volcano located in the central part of Iturup Island, Kuril Islands, controlled by Russia, and claimed by Japan.  There is an ongoing eruption there.

There are at least two named volcanoes:
 Japanese: 小田萌山 Odamoi yama
 Japanese: 焼山 Yake-yama  Russian: Иван Грозный Volcan Ivan Grozny

See also
 List of volcanoes in Russia
 List of volcanoes in Japan

Notes

There is not an ongoing eruption there.

References
 

Iturup
Active volcanoes
Complex volcanoes
Volcanoes of the Kuril Islands